Arthur "Chick" Johnson (born 28 October 1890) was an English rugby league footballer who played in the 1900s, 1910s and 1920s. Arthur Johnson inherited his nickname of 'Chick' from his father, the rugby league footballer who played in the 1890s for Lancashire, and Widnes; Old 'Chick' (James "Jim") Johnson.

Playing career

International honours
On the 1914 Great Britain Lions tour of Australia and New Zealand, Widnes provided Jack O'Garra, from a well-known footballing family, and Arthur "Chick" Johnson a renowned as an exponent of the long-dead art of dribbling a rugby ball. With 20 minutes left in the game he dribbled the ball from inside his own half, beating Australia's , Howard Hallett, to score a try, in what became known as the Rorke's Drift Test.

Johnson, gained a cap for England at Widnes in 1914 against Wales, and four caps for Great Britain while at Widnes in 1914 against Australia, and New Zealand, and He was selected to go on the 1920 Great Britain Lions tour of Australasia and played against Australia (two matches).

Club career
Johnson is a Widnes Hall Of Fame Inductee. Johnson made his début for Warrington on 3 February 1923, and made his final appearance for Warrington on 15 November 1924, making 40-appearances for Warrington in 1923–24 season.

Notes

References

External links
Statistics at rugby.widnes.tv
Hall Of Fame at rugby.widnes.tv

1890 births
English rugby league players
England national rugby league team players
Great Britain national rugby league team players
Place of birth missing
Place of death missing
Rugby league hookers
Rugby league locks
Rugby league players from Widnes
Rugby league props
Rugby league utility players
Rugby league wingers
Warrington Wolves players
Widnes Vikings players
Year of death missing